Baotianmansaurus (named after the Baotianman National Nature Reserve) is a genus of titanosaur sauropod dinosaur.  Its fossils have been found in Upper Cretaceous rocks in Henan, China, within the Gaogou Formation. The type species is B. henanensis, described in 2009. The holotype is 41H III-0200. Remains of the fossils were vertebrae, ribs and scapula fragments. It was probably a close relative of Opisthocoelicaudia and Dongyangosaurus in Saltasauridae.

References

Late Cretaceous dinosaurs of Asia
Titanosaurs
Fossil taxa described in 2009
Paleontology in Henan
Taxa named by Lü Junchang